The 2009 Algarve Cup was the sixteenth edition of the Algarve Cup, an invitational women's football tournament held annually in Portugal. It took place between 4 and 11 March 2009. It was won by Sweden who defeated holders the United States in a penalty shootout after a 1–1 draw in the final-game.

Format
The twelve invited teams were split into three groups that played a round-robin tournament.  The entrants were almost identical to the previous year, but Iceland moved up into Group B from their previous ranking in 2008, replacing Italy who did not feature this time. Wales returned to the competition for the first time in five years, while Austria appeared in the competition for the first time.

Groups A and B, containing the strongest ranked teams, were the only ones in contention to win the title. The group winners from A and B contested the final, with the runners-up playing for third place and those that finished third in these two groups playing for fifth place.

The teams in Group C were playing for places 7-12, with the winner of Group C playing the team that finished fourth in Group A or B with the better record for seventh place and the Group C runner-up playing the team which came last in Group A or B with the worse record for ninth place. The third and fourth-placed teams in Group C played for eleventh place.

Points awarded in the group stage follow the standard formula of three points for a win, one point for a draw and zero points for a loss. In the case of two teams being tied on the same number of points in a group, their head-to-head result determined the higher place.

Teams
The twelve invited teams were:

Group stage
All times local (WET/UTC+0)

Group A

Group B

Group C

Placement play-offs
All times local (WET/UTC+0)

11th place

9th place

7th place

5th place

3rd place

Final

References

External links

al
2008–09 in Portuguese football
2009
March 2009 sports events in Europe
2009 in Portuguese women's sport